Events from the year 1809 in Sweden

Incumbents
 Monarch – Gustav IV Adolf then Charles XIII

Events
 29 March - Coup of 1809: Gustav IV Adolf of Sweden is deposed in a coup d'état and his uncle is made Regent. 
 May - The Committee on the Constitution (Parliament of Sweden) is established. 
 10 May - The former King's son is also deprived of his right to the throne. 
 5 June - The former king's uncle Charles XIII of Sweden is placed upon the throne after having accepted a new constitution. 
 6 June - Instrument of Government (1809).
 18 July - Charles August is elected new heir to the throne of Sweden.
 19-20 August - Battle of Ratan and Sävar 
 17 September - Treaty of Fredrikshamn
 Inauguration of the Malmö Teater in Malmö. 
 December - The former monarch and his family leaves Sweden for Germany.
  Allmänna institutet för Blinda och Döfstumma (Public Institute of the Blind and Deaf), the first school for deaf and mute students, is inaugurated in Stockholm by Pär Aron Borg with a demonstration by Charlotta Seuerling.

Births
 6 January – Sven Lovén, marine zoologist and malacologist  (died 1895)
 21 August – Hanna Brooman, composer, translator and educator (died 1887) 
 7 September - Wilhelmina Gravallius, writer  (died 1884)
 - Angelique Magito, actress  (died 1895)

Deaths
 1 May – Maria Elisabet de Broen, translator and theatre manager (born 1756)
 25 July - Charlotta Roos, medium  (born 1771)
 Jeanna von Lantingshausen, politically active socialite  (born 1753)
 Hedvig Sofia von Rosen, royal governess (born 1734)

References

 
Years of the 19th century in Sweden